Pseudowaagenia is a genus of extinct ammonoid cephalopods in the family Aspidoceratidae.

Distribution
Shells of this species have been found in the Jurassic of Italy and Madagascar.

See also 
 List of Ammonite Genera

References 

 The Paleobiology Database
 Sepkoski, Jack Sepkoski's Online Genus Database – Cephalopodes
 Antonio Checa Phylogenetic relations among Oxfordian and KimmeridgianAspidoceratinae ≪classical species≫, deduced from the subbetic record (South Spain). A proposal eobios, Volume 17, issue 1 (1984), p. 21-31
 Antonio Checa Structural changes in the passage Euaspidoceratiforms-Aspidoceratiforms (Aspidoceratidae, Ammonitina)

External links 
 Fossils Japan

Ammonitida genera
Jurassic ammonites
Prehistoric animals of Madagascar